Orval Butcher (December 1, 1917 Valton, Wisconsin –October 5, 2010) was the founding pastor of Skyline Church located in Lemon Grove, California, a suburb of San Diego.  He was senior pastor of the church for 27 years and grew the regular attendance to over 1,100.  Butcher was a graduate of Miltonvale Wesleyan College, now part of Oklahoma Wesleyan University.  He was known for his outstanding singing voice and spent several years as a traveling evangelist with Billy Graham.

External links
 Orval Butcher Missions official website
 Skyline Church official website

References

American Christian clergy
1917 births
2010 deaths
Oklahoma Wesleyan University alumni
People from Lemon Grove, California
People from Sauk County, Wisconsin